Andrés Allamand Zavala (born February 7, 1956), a Chilean politician, is the founder and one of the past leaders of Renovación Nacional. He is of French, and Basque descent. On January 14, 2011 he was named Minister of Defense by president Sebastián Piñera. He was sworn in on January 16, 2011 and left office on November 5, 2012. He was named Minister of Foreign Affairs following a Cabinet reshuffle on 28 July, 2021, resigning the Senate seat he had held since 2014. Allamand is a member of the Inter-American Dialogue.

References

External links

 Web Site of Andrés Allamand (in spanish)
Andrés Allamand on Wikilosríos 

1956 births
Living people
Candidates for President of Chile
Chilean Ministers of Defense
Chilean people of Basque descent
Chilean people of French descent
Foreign ministers of Chile
Members of the Chamber of Deputies of Chile
Members of the Inter-American Dialogue
Members of the Senate of Chile
National Party (Chile, 1966) politicians
Movimiento de Unión Nacional politicians
National Renewal (Chile) politicians
Politicians from Santiago
University of Chile alumni
Senators of the LV Legislative Period of the National Congress of Chile